γ-Glutamylmethylamide (gamma-Glutamylmethylamide, abbrev. GMA, synonyms N-methyl-L-glutamine, metheanine) is an amino acid analog of the proteinogenic amino acids L-glutamic acid and L-glutamine, found primarily in plant and fungal species; simply speaking, it is L-glutamine methylated on the amide nitrogen. It is an identified  important biosynthetic intermediate allowing bacteria (e.g., methanotrophs) use of methylated amines as carbon and nitrogen source for growth (and so of significant biotechnological interest). Like its close relative theanine, it is a pharmacologically active constituent of green tea, with preliminary evidence for at least comparable activity to theanine as a hypotensive.

See also 
 Theanine
 Health effects of tea

References 

Amino acids
Tea